Héctor Santos may refer to:

 Héctor Santos (footballer) (born 1944), Uruguayan footballer
 Héctor Santos (athlete) (born 1998), Spanish long jumper